Khwaja Saeed (11 March 1911 – 22 December 1968) was a Pakistani cricket umpire. He stood in five Test matches between 1959 and 1961.

See also
 List of Test cricket umpires

References

1911 births
1968 deaths
Pakistani Test cricket umpires
Pakistani cricketers
Northern India cricketers
Western India cricketers
Muslims cricketers
West Zone cricketers
Cricketers from Lahore